Saint-Saturnin-lès-Avignon (literally St. Saturnin near Avignon) is a commune in the Vaucluse department in the Provence-Alpes-Côte d'Azur region in Southeastern France. In 2018, it had a population of 4,857.

History
The poet Jean Tortel (1904–1993) was born in Saint-Saturnin-lès-Avignon.

See also
Communes of the Vaucluse department

References

Communes of Vaucluse